Ögmundar þáttr dytts ok Gunnars helmings is one of the Icelandic þættir. It was written in the 14th century. It relates the story of Ögmundr dyttr, a cousin of Víga-Glúmr from Víga-Glúms saga. He is insulted in Norway and achieves revenge in a clever way. The second part of the saga relates the adventures of Gunnarr helmingr and his interaction with a cult of Freyr in Sweden.

Gunnar was suspected of manslaughter and escaped to Sweden, where people still blóted to Freyr. The Swedes had appointed a young and beautiful woman to serve the fertility god, and Gunnar became acquainted with this young priestess. He helped her drive Freyr's wagon with the god effigy in it, but the god did not appreciate Gunnar and so attacked him and would have killed Gunnar if he had not promised himself to return to the Christian faith if he would make it back to Norway. When Gunnar had promised this, a demon jumped out of the god effigy and so Freyr was nothing but a piece of wood. Gunnar destroyed the wooden idol and dressed himself as Freyr, and then Gunnar and the priestess travelled across Sweden where people were happy to see the god visiting them. After a while, he made the priestess pregnant, but this was seen by the Swedes as confirmation that Freyr was truly a fertility god and not a scam. Finally, Gunnar had to flee back to Norway with his young bride and had her baptized at the court of Olaf Tryggvason.

External links
Text of the story with Modern Icelandic spelling
Anderson, Carl Edlund. (1999). Formation and Resolution of Ideological Contrast in the Early History of Scandinavia. Ph.D. thesis, University of Cambridge, Department of Anglo-Saxon, Norse & Celtic (Faculty of English). p. 64.
Heinrichs, Anne: The Search for Identity: A Problem after the Conversion, in Alvíssmál 3. pp.52-55.

Þættir
Freyr